Faith Green was an American screenwriter active during Hollywood's silent era. She worked with directors like David Hartford, King Vidor, and Henry McRae.

Green got her start as a journalist in New York City before turning to screenwriting; she also served as secretary of the New York Pen & Brush Club. Mrs. Green (husband unknown) resided in New York but also worked extensively in Canada. She was also valued due to her editing skills and knowledge of censor boards in the U.S. and Canada.

She spent time with Ralph Connor and adapted many of his novels for the big screen. At one point, she was in talks with Canada's Lady Byng of Vimy to adapt a story into a film, but this doesn't seem to have come to fruition.

Selected filmography 

 Blue Water (1924)
 Glengarry School Days (1923)
 The Man from Glengarry (1922)
 The Rapids (1922)
 Cameron of the Royal Mounted (1921)
 God's Crucible (1921)
 The Sky Pilot (1921)

References 

American women screenwriters
Year of birth missing
Year of death missing